This was the first edition of the tournament.

Robert Galloway and Nathan Pasha won the title after defeating Matt Reid and John-Patrick Smith 6–4, 4–6, [10–6] in the final.

Seeds

Draw

References
 Main Draw

Calgary National Bank Challenger - Doubles